Pandercetes plumipes, is a species of spider of the genus Pandercetes. It is native to Ambon Islands, Sri Lanka and New Guinea.

See also
 List of Sparassidae species

References

Sparassidae
Arthropods of New Guinea
Spiders of Asia
Spiders described in 1859